Search Out is a 2020 South Korean thriller film written and directed by Kwak Jung, starring Lee Si-eon, Kim Sung-cheol and Heo Ga-yoon. Inspired by the Blue Whale Challenge, it was released on April 15, 2020.

Plot
A trainee policeman, a job seeker and a hacker team up to find out who sent the message "What is the significance of your life?" to a woman who ended up committing suicide.

Cast

Main
 Heo Ga-yoon as Noo-ri
 Lee Si-eon as Sung-min
 Kim Sung-cheol as Joon-hyuk

Supporting
 Go Jung-il as Detective Go
 Kim Ji-na as Ji-na
 Shim Wan-joon as Jin-woo
 Choi Yoon-bin as Detective
 Kim Seo-yeon as Seo-won
 Ju Shi-hyun as Jae-min
 Bae Sang-woo as Sociopath
 Lee Yeon-bin as Kyung-won

Special appearance
 Son Byong-ho as Convenience store boss

Production
Director and screenwriter Kwak Jung "wanted to dig deep into how social media is misused as an instrument of crime, to raise awareness of social isolation among young adults and to discuss fundamental questions surrounding life and death."

Release
The film was postponed by a week (being released on April 15, 2020 instead of April 9) due to the COVID-19 pandemic.

Reception
The film topped the domestic box office on its release day despite the COVID-19 pandemic.

References

External links
 
 
 

2020 films
2020s Korean-language films
2020 thriller films
South Korean thriller films
Films about the Internet
Films about social media
Films about cyberbullying
Thriller films based on actual events
Films postponed due to the COVID-19 pandemic